The Third Thorbecke cabinet was the cabinet of the Netherlands from 4 January 1871 until 6 July 1872. The cabinet was formed by Independent Liberals (Ind. Lib.). The Centre-right cabinet was a minority government in the House of Representatives. Independent Liberal Johan Rudolph Thorbecke was Prime Minister.

Cabinet members

 Resigned.
 Served ad interim.
 Retained this position from the previous cabinet.
 Died in office.

References

External links
Official

  Kabinet-Thorbecke III Parlement & Politiek

Cabinets of the Netherlands
1871 establishments in the Netherlands
1872 disestablishments in the Netherlands
Cabinets established in 1871
Cabinets disestablished in 1872
Minority governments